
Year 1535 (MDXXXV) was a common year starting on Friday (link will display the full calendar) of the Julian calendar.

Events 
 January–June 
 January 18 – Lima, Peru, is founded by Francisco Pizarro, as Ciudad de los Reyes.
 February 27 – George Joye publishes his Apologye in Antwerp, to clear his name from the accusations of William Tyndale.
 March – English forces under William Skeffington storm Maynooth Castle in Ireland, the stronghold of Thomas FitzGerald, 10th Earl of Kildare.
 March 10 – Fray Tomás de Berlanga discovers the Galápagos Islands, when blown off course en route to Peru.
 May 4 – The first of the English Carthusian Martyrs is executed.
 May 10 – Amsterdam: A small troop of Anabaptists, led by the minister Jacob van Geel, attacks the city hall, in an attempted coup to seize the city. In the counter-attack by the city's militia, the burgemeester, Pieter Colijns, is killed by the rebels. In another incident this year in Amsterdam, seven men and five women walk nude in the streets; and Anabaptists rebel in other cities of the Netherlands.
 May 19 – French explorer Jacques Cartier sets sail for his second voyage to North America with three ships, 110 men, and Chief Donnacona's two sons (taken by Cartier during his first voyage).
 May 20 – William Tyndale is arrested in Antwerp for heresy, in relation to his Bible translation, and imprisoned in Vilvoorde.
 June 1 – The Conquest of Tunis by Charles V, Holy Roman Emperor, begins with the destruction of Barbarossa's fleet. Following the eventual capture of the city from the Ottoman Empire, around 30,000 inhabitants are massacred.
 June 8 – Battle of Bornholm: Combined Swedish and Danish fleets defeat the Hanseatic navy.
 June 22 – Cardinal John Fisher, Bishop of Rochester, is executed for his refusal to swear an oath of loyalty to King Henry VIII of England.
 June 24 – Münster Rebellion: The Anabaptist state of Münster is conquered and disbanded.

 July–December 
 July 6 – Sir Thomas More, author of Utopia and one time Lord Chancellor of England, is executed for treason, after refusing to recognize King Henry VIII as head of the English Church, and separate from the Roman Catholic Church.
 July 15 – Archdeacon Charles Reynolds (cleric), envoy to James V, Charles V, and Pope Paul III, is buried in Rome. He died of malaria while lobbying for the excommunication of King Henry VIII for heresy.
 October 2 – Jacques Cartier reaches the island in the Saint Lawrence River, that eventually becomes Montreal.
 October 4 – The first complete English-language Bible is printed in Antwerp, with translations by William Tyndale and Myles Coverdale.
 December – Manco Inca Yupanqui, nominally Sapa Inca, is imprisoned by the Spanish Conquistadors of Peru.

 Date unknown 
 Mughal Emperor Humayun gives battle to Bahadur Shah of Gujarat.
 Spanish forces abandon the second attempted conquest of Yucatán.
 The earliest (partially) preserved printed book in Estonian, a Catechism with a translation by Johann Koell from the Middle Low German Lutheran text of Simon Wanradt, is printed by Hans Lufft in Wittenberg, for use in Tallinn.
 Suleiman the Magnificent begins the rebuilding of the walls around Jerusalem.
 Paracelsus visits Bad Pfäfers.

Births 

 February 11 – Pope Gregory XIV (d. 1591)
 January 7 – Edward Stafford, 3rd Baron Stafford, English baron (d. 1603)
 February 24 – Eléanor de Roucy de Roye, French noble (d. 1564)
 February 27 – Min Phalaung, Burmese monarch (d. 1593)
 February 28 – Cornelius Gemma, Dutch astronomer and astrologer (d. 1578)
 March 10 – William of Rosenberg, High Treasurer and High Burgrave of Bohemia (d. 1592)
 March 23 – Sophie of Brandenburg-Ansbach, princess of Brandenburg-Ansbach (d. 1587)
 May 31 – Alessandro Allori, Italian painter (d. 1607)
 June 2 – Pope Leo XI (d. 1605)
 June 18 – Jakub Krčín, Czech architect (d. 1604)
 June 21 – Leonhard Rauwolf, German physician and botanist (d. 1596)
 June 24 – Joanna of Austria, Princess of Portugal (d. 1573)
 July 4 – William the Younger, Duke of Brunswick-Lüneburg (d. 1592)
 July 21 – García Hurtado de Mendoza, 5th Marquis of Cañete, Royal Governor of Chile (d. 1609)
 July 22 – Katarina Stenbock, queen of Gustav I of Sweden (d. 1621)
 August 21 – Shimazu Yoshihiro, Japanese samurai and warlord (d. 1619)
 September 6 – Emanuel van Meteren, Flemish historian (d. 1612)
 September 18 – Henry Brandon, 2nd Duke of Suffolk (d. 1551)
 October 16 – Niwa Nagahide, Japanese warlord (d. 1585)
 November 9 – Nanda Bayin, King of Burma (d. 1600)
 December 12 – Gilbert Génébrard, Roman Catholic archbishop (d. 1597)
 December 28 – Martin Eisengrein, German theologian (d. 1578)
 date unknown
 Federico Barocci, Italian painter (d. 1612)
 Niels Kaas, Danish chancellor (d. 1594)
 James Melville of Halhill, Scottish historian (d. 1617)
 Thomas North, English translator (d. c. 1604)
 Giaches de Wert, Flemish composer (d. 1596)
 Benedict Pereira, Spanish theologian (d. 1610)

Deaths 

 February 18 – Heinrich Cornelius Agrippa, German alchemist and occult writer (b. 1486)
 February 28 – Wolter von Plettenberg, Master of the Livonian Order (b. 1450)
 April 4 – Beatrix of Baden, Margravine of Baden, Countess Palatine consort of Simmern (b. 1492)
 May 4 (executed by Henry VIII of England):
 Saint John Houghton, Carthusian monk
 Saint Robert Lawrence, Carthusian monk
 Saint Augustine Webster, Prior of the London Charterhouse
 Saint Richard Reynolds,  Bridgettine monk of Syon
 May 26 – Francesco Berni, Italian poet (b. 1497)
 June 12 – Elisabeth Wandscherer, Dutch Anabaptist
 June 19 – Sebastian Newdigate, Carthusian monk and martyr (b. 1500)
 June 22 – John Fisher, Bishop of Rochester (executed) (b. c. 1469)
 July 6 – Sir Thomas More, English lawyer, writer, and politician (executed) (b. 1478)
 July 11 – Joachim I Nestor, Elector of Brandenburg (b. 1484)
 August 10 – Ippolito de' Medici, ruler of Florence (poisoned) (b. 1509)
 September – George Nevill, 5th Baron Bergavenny (b. 1469)
 September 23 – Catherine of Saxe-Lauenburg, queen of Gustav I of Sweden (b. 1513)
 November 17 – Piero de Ponte, 45th Grandmaster of the Knights Hospitaller (b. 1462)
 December 29 – Matsudaira Kiyoyasu, Japanese daimyo (b. 1511)
 December 31 – William Skeffington, Lord Deputy of Ireland (b. 1465)
 date unknown
 Jodocus Badius, Flemish pioneer of printing (b. 1462)
 Canghali of Kazan, khan of Qasim and Kazan (b. 1516)
 Bartolomeo Tromboncino, Italian composer (b. 1470)
 Feliks Zamoyski, Polish noble

References